Joseph Clark Shipley (born May 9, 1935) is a retired American professional baseball player. The right-handed pitcher appeared in 29 games over four seasons in Major League Baseball for the San Francisco Giants (1958–60) and Chicago White Sox (1963).

Career
Shipley's pro career lasted for 13 seasons (1953–65). Twenty-eight of his 29 big-league appearances came as a relief pitcher. In his one starting assignment, the second game of a doubleheader against the Philadelphia Phillies on June 14, 1959, he allowed two hits, five bases on balls and two earned runs in 2 innings pitched, and did not gain a decision in an eventual 6–3 Giants' loss.

All told, Shipley posted a 0–1 record with a 5.93 earned run average in the majors. He worked 44 innings, allowing 48 hits and 35 walks; he struck out 23. He had 13 games finished and no saves.

After his professional pitching career ended, Shipley became head coach of the East Tennessee State University baseball team, serving from 1966–77. He was elected to the university's Sports Hall of Fame in 2002.

References

External links

1935 births
Living people
American expatriate baseball players in Mexico
Baseball coaches from Tennessee
Baseball players from Tennessee
Big Stone Gap Rebels players
Broncos de Reynosa players
Chicago White Sox players
East Tennessee State Buccaneers baseball coaches
El Paso Sun Kings players
Indianapolis Indians players
Jacksonville Suns players
Johnstown Johnnies players
Major League Baseball pitchers
Mayfield Clothiers players
Mexican League baseball pitchers
Minneapolis Millers (baseball) players
Olean Giants players
People from Morristown, Tennessee
Phoenix Giants players
Portsmouth-Norfolk Tides players
Salt Lake City Bees players
San Francisco Giants players
Shelby Clippers players
Springfield Giants players
Tacoma Giants players
Tulsa Oilers (baseball) players
Vidalia Indians players